James Hume (27 February 1823–28 August 1896) was a New Zealand asylum superintendent . He was born in Glasgow, Lanarkshire, Scotland on 27 February 1823.

References

1823 births
1896 deaths
People in health professions from Glasgow
New Zealand psychiatrists
Scottish emigrants to New Zealand
19th-century New Zealand medical doctors